Mali Vrh is a small village in the Municipality of Mirna Peč in southeastern Slovenia. The area is part of the historical region of Lower Carniola. The municipality is now included in the Southeast Slovenia Statistical Region.

Name
Mali Vrh was attested in historical sources as sand Matheus in 1386, Perg in 1433, and Mons in 1490, among other names.

Church
The local church is dedicated to Saint Matthew and belongs to the Parish of Mirna Peč. It preserves some of its late Gothic features despite being restyled in the Baroque in the early 17th century.

References

External links
Mali Vrh on Geopedia

Populated places in the Municipality of Mirna Peč